The 1997 Nokia Open was a men's tennis tournament played on indoor hard courts. It is the 5th edition of the China Open, and is part of the World Series of the 1997 ATP Tour. The event was held at the Beijing International Tennis Center in Beijing, China. The event took place from September 29 to October 5. First-seeded Jim Courier won the singles title.

Finals

Singles

 Jim Courier defeated  Magnus Gustafsson, 7–6(12–10), 3–6, 6–3

Doubles

 Mahesh Bhupathi /  Leander Paes defeated  Jim Courier /  Alex O'Brien, 7–5, 7–6(9–7)

References

External links
China Open on the official Association of Tennis Professionals website

China Open
1997
1997 in Chinese tennis